Trabala prasinophena is a moth of the family Lasiocampidae first described by Tams in 1931. It is found in the Democratic Republic of the Congo.

References

Lasiocampidae
Insects of the Democratic Republic of the Congo
Insects of Uganda
Moths of Africa
Endemic fauna of the Democratic Republic of the Congo